Caldew was a British steam fishing trawler. Launched in 1914 as Maristo, she was requisitioned by the Royal Navy for service in the First World War the following year. Maristo survived the war and resumed trawling for the next two decades, being renamed Caldew in that time. She collided with fellow trawler Ospray II in 1935, sinking the latter ship.

The submarine proceeded to order the trawler's crew into a lifeboat, after which the Caldew was sunk by U-33s deck gun. The crew were rescued but were captured by a German destroyer, who interned them in Germany. The crew of the Caldew were not liberated until the end of the war, and were the only British fishermen to be taken prisoner during the war.

Construction and design
Maristo (Official Number 128769) was constructed in North Shields by Smith's Dock Company Ltd., who also constructed the 97-horsepower T.3-cylinder engine. Maristo was launched on 10 May 1914 and was registered in Milford Haven by owner James Thomas on 6 November of the same year.

History

Early service
In December 1915, a year after Maristos registration, the trawler was requisitioned by the Royal Navy for active service in the First World War. During the conflict, the trawler was based at Portsmouth as a minesweeper and was armed with a 12-pounder gun. At some point in 1917, Caldew claimed an unconfirmed kill on a German submarine along with the armed trawler . The trawler was sold to Wyre Steam Trawling Co. Ltd of Fleetwood on 26 October 1917 and was returned to the company in September 1919, ten months after the end of the war. Maristo had been renamed Caldew by 30 September 1921, as she was registered at Fleetwood under the latter name on that day.

On 14 February 1931, Caldew, along with fellow trawlers Dhoon and River Clyde, responded to a distress call made by the Finnish steamship Malve, which had run aground on the island of Tiree in gale-force winds. The three trawlers stood by to assist, but Malve failed to refloat and was eventually abandoned by its crew. 4 years later, on 6 April 1935, Caldew collided with fellow Fleetwood trawler Ospray II while trawling south of Gigha. The collision tore a large hole in the Ospray II, causing fatal damage and leading to the trawler's sinking less than an hour later. The two skippers of the trawlers were blamed in an inquiry for not keeping watch at the time of the collision, and both had their certificates of competence revoked for a year. The Caldew was sold to St. Andrew's Steam Fishing Co Ltd. in 1938.

Sinking
On 16 September 1939, fifteen days after the outbreak of the Second World War, the Caldew, captained by Skipper Thomas Kane with twelve crewmen on board, set sail from Fleetwood to the Faroe Islands fishing grounds. After landing one of the crew members in the Faroes on 21 September, the ship began to trawl off the island chain. The Caldew crew were rescued by the Swedish steamer Kronprinsessan Margaeta, which itself was intercepted by the German destroyer  and torpedo boat  on 27 September. The destroyer interned the crew and transported them to Germany, where they were held at Sandbostel and Milag 8 prisoner of war camps. Skipper Kane and three hands were repatriated in prisoner exchanges during the war, while the remainder of the crew were liberated at the end of the war. The Caldew was the forty-second ship and the fifth trawler to be sunk by U-boats during the war, while the crew were the first Allied seamen and only British fishermen to be taken prisoner by German forces during the war.

References

External links
 Photograph of the Caldew

1914 ships
Trawlers
Naval trawlers of the United Kingdom
Steamships of the United Kingdom
World War I minesweepers of the United Kingdom
Maritime incidents in September 1939
Ships sunk by German submarines in World War II
World War II shipwrecks in the North Sea
Ships sunk with no fatalities